Scania (Skåne) is the southernmost province of Sweden.

Scania may also refer to: 

People
 Duke of Scania
 Duchess of Scania

Places
 460 Scania, asteroid named after the province of Scania

Companies
 Scania AB  (Scania-Vabis), Swedish automotive manufacturer with origins in Scania
 Maskinfabriks-aktiebolaget Scania, predecessor to Scania-Vabis
 Saab-Scania, former parent company of Scania-Vabis

Other uses
 Scania Party, separatist political party
 Scania (moth), a genus of moth
 Scania goose, a breed of domestic geese
 Scania Market, annual market for herring in Scania during the Middle Ages
 Scania Arena, an arena in Duisburg, Germany
 Scania, a server in the Korean role-playing game MapleStory
 , a U.S. Navy ship name
 , an Artemis-class attack cargo ship

See also
 Scanian War (1675-1679)
 Skåne (disambiguation)
 Skåneland, the wider region including Scania, sometimes referred to as "the Scanian provinces"